饅頭 may refer to:

 Mandu, dumplings in Korean cuisine
 Manjū, a Japanese steamed bun with filling
 Mántou, a Chinese steamed bun without filling